Canarias7 is a Spanish language newspaper published in Las Palmas de Gran Canaria, Canary Islands.

History and profile
Canarias7 was first published on 2 October 1982. The paper is part of Informaciones Canarias S.A. and has its headquarters in Las Palmas de Gran Canaria. Its sister paper is La Provincia.

References

External links
 Official website

1982 establishments in Spain
Mass media in Las Palmas
Daily newspapers published in Spain
Publications established in 1982
Spanish-language newspapers